The UB Mingoes are the varsity intercollegiate athletic programs of the University of the Bahamas. The program has six clubs and is aiming to join the National Association of Intercollegiate Athletics.

History 
On February 28, 2017 the Government of the Bahamas announced the Mingoes as the university's name and revealed the mascot. The goal of the program is to join the NAIA.

The men's soccer team won the BFA Senior League title in 2017–18.

Teams 
 Men Track & Field
 Women's Track & Field
 Men's Soccer
 Men's Basketball
 Women's Volleyball
 Women's Softball

References 

University and college sports clubs in the Bahamas
Sport in Nassau, Bahamas